The Saint Lucia women's national football team is the representative women's association football team of Saint Lucia. Its governing body is the Saint Lucia Football Association (SLFA) and it competes as a member of the Confederation of North, Central America and Caribbean Association Football (CONCACAF).

The national team's first activity was in early 2000s, when they competed at the inaugural Caribbean Football Union Women's Championship. the Saint Lucian showed high and good performance in their Debut match against British Virgin Islands in which they won by a score of 8 to nil. their second match, on the other hand, gave them their biggest win by a score of 13 to nil. Saint Lucia is currently ranked 150th in the FIFA Women's World Rankings.

Record per opponent
Key

The following table shows Niger' all-time official international record per opponent:

Results

2000

2002

2006

2010

2014

2015

2017

2018

2019

See also
 Saint Lucia national football team results

References

External links
 Saint Lucia results on The Roon Ba
 Saint Lucia results on Globalsports
 Saint Lucia results on worldfootball.net
 Saint Lucia results on soccerway

2000s in Saint Lucia
2010s in Saint Lucia
Women's national association football team results
results